John the Eunuch can refer to:

 John the Orphanotrophos, 11th-century Byzantine courtier
 John the Eunuch (Trebizond), 14th-century courtier in the Empire of Trebizond